Augusto Gutiérrez (born 3 October 1930) is a Venezuelan former foil and sabre fencer. He competed at the 1952 and 1960 Summer Olympics.

References

External links
 

1930 births
Possibly living people
Venezuelan male foil fencers
Olympic fencers of Venezuela
Fencers at the 1952 Summer Olympics
Fencers at the 1960 Summer Olympics
Pan American Games medalists in fencing
Pan American Games bronze medalists for Venezuela
Fencers at the 1955 Pan American Games
Fencers at the 1963 Pan American Games
Venezuelan male sabre fencers
People from Táchira
20th-century Venezuelan people